Dierker is a surname. Notable people with the surname include:

Chris Dierker (born 1994), Vietnamese-American basketball player
Hugh Dierker, American film director and producer
Larry Dierker (born 1946), American baseball player, manager, and broadcaster

See also
Dierkes